AGR may refer to:

Finance
 Adjusted Gross Revenue, an accounting term related to revenue
 Agere Systems, a ticker symbol on the New York Stock Exchange

Technology
 Accessory gene regulator, genes that control the virulence of Staphylococcus aureus
 Adaptive Gabor representation
 Advanced Gas-cooled Reactor, a type of nuclear reactor
 Advanced Graphics Riser, a type of slot found on some computer motherboards
 Auxiliary radar picket ship, in the U.S. Navy hull classification system

Transport
 AGR (automobile), an English automobile
 Agra airport in India, in its International Air Transport Association (IATA) code
 Alabama and Gulf Coast Railway, in its reporting mark
 Angel Road railway station in the UK, in its three-letter station code
 Avon Park Air Force Range in the US, in its Federal Aviation Administration location identifier (FAA LID)

Language and linguistics
 Agr (linguistics), a term which is used in the theory of linguistics.
 Agreement (linguistics), morphological change depending on other words
 Aguaruna language, a language spoken in Northern Peru

Other uses
 Agr. (profession), abbreviation and title for a professional agriculturist
Active Guard Reserve, a restricted and specialized active duty program of US military reserves
 Agenzia Giornalistica RCS, an Italian news agency
 Agrippa (praenomen)
 Agritubel, a French professional road race cycling team
 Alpha Gamma Rho, the largest social-professional fraternity in the US
 Amstel Gold Race, a Dutch cycling classic
 Andretti Green Racing, a racing team in the IndyCar Series
 Architectural gear ratio, also known as anatomical gear ratio
 Asheville Global Report, an independent weekly newspaper
 Association of Graduate Recruiters